Mount Stagnaro is a mountain (1,130 m) located 3 nautical miles (6 km) east-northeast of Mount Gonzalez, Sarnoff Mountains, in the Ford Ranges, Marie Byrd Land. The mountain was surveyed and mapped by the United States Antarctic Service (USAS), 1939–41. Named by Advisory Committee on Antarctic Names (US-ACAN) in 1980 after John Stagnaro of La Crescenta, CA, who during the 1970s carried out nightly Ham radio schedules with the South Pole, McMurdo, Palmer and Siple Stations, connecting personnel at isolated research stations with family and friends in the United States. The ham radio patches provided by "Big John" over many years were a significant factor in maintaining high morale at these stations.

References

Mountains of Marie Byrd Land